Ruben Popa (born 22 March 1989) is a Romanian footballer who plays for FSV Pfaffenhofen.

Popa started off his footballing career training three times a week at Romanian club FC UTA Arad, before later moving to Germany with his father. At the end of June 2009, Popa signed for SSV Jahn Regensburg II and made his professional debut for the first team during the 2011–12 3. Liga season in a 2–0 away loss to SC Preußen Münster. In summer 2013, he was promoted to the senior team.

References

External links 
 

1989 births
Living people
Romanian footballers
Association football forwards
3. Liga players
FC UTA Arad players
CS Național Sebiș players
SSV Jahn Regensburg players 
Romanian expatriate sportspeople in Germany
SSV Jahn Regensburg II players